Kushk-e Hasanabad (also Romanized as Kūshk-e Ḩasanābād; also known as Kūshk) is a village in Posht Par Rural District, Simakan District, Jahrom County, Fars Province, Iran. At the 2006 census, its population was 344, in 72 families.

References 

Populated places in Jahrom County